Aq Divar may refer to:
 Aq Divar, Ardabil
 Aq Divar, East Azerbaijan